Rayksi is a Polish surname. Notable people with the surname include:

Adam Rayski (1913–2008), Franco-Polish journalist and Resistance leader
Ferdinand von Rayski (1806–1890), German painter
Ludomił Rayski (1892–1977), Polish Air Force general

Polish-language surnames